Cranley Gardens may refer to the following places in London, England:

London
 Cranley Gardens, Haringey, a location
 Cranley Gardens railway station, a former station in Muswell Hill, Hornsey
 Saint Peter, Cranley Gardens or Church of St Yeghiche, an Armenian Apostolic Church in South Kensington